Heil may refer to:
Heil (surname)
Heil, North Dakota, a census-designated place and unincorporated community in the United States
Heil Hitler, Sieg Heil, a Nazi salute
Heil Sound, a manufacturer of audio and studio equipment. 
Heil Environmental Industries, a subsidiary of Dover Corporation that manufactures garbage and recycling trucks
 Heil Heating & Cooling (HVAC) equipment manufacturer; a product line of International Comfort Products Corporation

See also
Hail (disambiguation)
Heyl